Independence Township is a township in Nodaway County, in the U.S. state of Missouri.

Independence Township was erected in 1856.

References

Townships in Missouri
Townships in Nodaway County, Missouri
Populated places established in 1856
1856 establishments in Missouri